Dendrosauridion, the Yanesha tree microtegu, is a genus of the lizard family Gymnophthalmidae. The genus is monotypic, i.e. it has only one species, Dendrosauridion yanesha. It occurs in Peru.

References

Gymnophthalmidae
Monotypic lizard genera
Reptiles of Peru
Endemic fauna of Peru
Taxa named by Edgar Lehr
Taxa named by Jiří Moravec (herpetologist)
Taxa named by Mikael Lundberg
Taxa named by Gunther Köhler
Taxa named by Alessandro Catenazzi
Taxa named by Jiří Šmíd